Mount Kerling ("Old Hag") is the highest mountain (1538 m) in the District of Eyjafjarðarsveit, in the northern part of Iceland. Its structure is mainly basaltic rock, but the uppermost part is rhyolite, which extends to Mts Súlur nearby and all the way to the lower slopes of Mt. Vindheimajökull  to the north of valley Glerárdalur. It is considered an easy climb with excellent panoramic views on a fine day.

References 

Mountains of Iceland
One-thousanders of Iceland